We Found It is the ninth collaborative studio album by Porter Wagoner and Dolly Parton. It was released on February 12, 1973, by RCA Victor. The album was among their lower charting albums, reaching #20 on the U.S. country albums chart, while the title single reached #30 on the country singles chart.

Critical reception
Billboard gave a positive review of the album, saying, "It's all original material, written individually and collectively by the pair, and they manage to mix love and happiness into a perfect blending. Some of their best material to date, and that says a great deal." The mentioned "I've Been Married (Just as Long as You Have)", "I Am Always Waiting", and "Sweet Rachel Ann" as the best cuts on the album.

Recording
Recording sessions for the album began at RCA Studio B in Nashville, Tennessee, on April 28, 1972, yielding only two tracks, of which "We Found It" made the final track listing. Two additional sessions followed on August 21 and 22, producing six of the album's tracks between them. The final session took place on November 29, from which two song were selected to complete the album. One track on the album, "How Close They Must Be", was recorded during the April 7, 1971 session for 1972's The Right Combination • Burning the Midnight Oil.

Track listing
Track listing, writing credits and track length adapted from LP sleeve.

References

Dolly Parton albums
Porter Wagoner albums
1973 albums
Albums produced by Bob Ferguson (music)
RCA Records albums
Vocal duet albums